The 1984–85 Libyan Premier League was the 18th edition of the competition since its inception in 1963.

Overview
It was contested by 16 teams, and Al-Dhahra won the championship.

Group stage

Group A

Group B

Playoff

Semifinal
Al Madina Tripoli 0-0 ; 0-1 Al-Dhahra
Al-Ahly (Benghazi)  1-0 ; 0-1 (PK 4–2) Al-Ahly (Tripoli)

Final
Al-Dhahra 0-0 (PK 2–1) Al-Ahly (Benghazi)

References
Libya - List of final tables (RSSSF)

Libyan Premier League seasons
1
Libya